Hawk Eyes are a rock band from Leeds, England. They formed in late 2004 and released their official debut album Modern Bodies on 1 November 2010 through Brew Records.

History

Early years (2004–2010)

The band played a part in the Leeds underground DIY metal and hardcore scene, amongst the local squats and dives. Some small CD splits and self-released CD-r's appeared during this time, all recorded with Ross Halden in his home basement studio Ghost Town Studios. Following years of house shows, small releases and self-organised tours, Brew Records picked up on the band and included them on their first release in 2007, a compilation entitled Volume 1 featuring other local bands part of the same DIY scene. This was to become a much stronger relationship as time passed. The band next decided to make an album of all the material they had to date and recorded it in sessions between Chris Fielding at Foel Studio in Wales and Jason Sanderson in Barnsley. Nottingham based label Sound Devastation released the self-titled debut on a limited run in 2008 and soon after Reid joined the band to complete the line-up and continue touring. The album and compilation both received great praise from the press.

In mid-2008, the band decided to film their first music video for the track 'NASA Vs ESA' (taken from the self-titled debut) and shortly after its release local Leeds label Brew Records, offered to add Hawk Eyes to their growing roster (I Concur, Kong, These Monsters, Castrovalva). They saw the year out with further touring and writing.

In March 2009, they returned to Jason Sanderson's studio to record their first material with latest member Reid. An EP entitled A. Or Not? (named after a close friend/promoter), and in support of the EP's release, they produced their second video for the track "I Hate This, Do You Like It?" in collaboration with the NME/SPIN magazine photographer Danny North. The EP was released in the late summer of 2009 following Hawk Eyes' first festival appearance on the BBC Introducing stage at the Leeds and Reading festivals and a UK tour with label mates Kong. At this point another Leeds independent label Dance To The Radio, asked the band to contribute a track towards their '4 X 12' series'. The track used was called Scorpieau - recorded by old friend Ross Halden at his newly located penthouse Ghost Town Studios mark II. Both the EP and the 12" split received positive national recognition. They closed the year off with their largest tour to date supporting US outfit The Fall of Troy across the UK.

Hawk Eyes started the year 2010 touring with The Computers and Outcry Collective, and were invited by Mike Davies to record at BBC's Maida Vale Studio in London for the Radio 1 punk rock show during the tour.
The band played over 10 festivals across the country including Leeds & Reading, Hevy Festival and Sonisphere. Brew then released Modern Bodies, a selection of songs taken from previous limited releases, collected together on one new album. Remixed By Kevin Vanbergen, remastered and featuring brand new artwork by Reid and North. The album received critical acclaim worldwide. A UK tour supporting We Are The Ocean and a UK/European tour supporting Alexisonfire followed with positive reviews.

2011–present

Between January and October the band recorded the follow up releases, Mindhammers and Ideas. During November Hawk Eyes toured the UK with Turbowolf and The JCQ.
In December, Hawk Eyes toured as main support for Ginger Wildheart.
On 12 December, Hawk Eyes released Mindhammers, a 5 track EP available by download and on limited 10" vinyl.

Hawk Eyes released Ideas on 21 March 2012 through Vinyl Junkie in Japan and 26 March 2012 on Fierce Panda in the UK. It was revealed that their drummer Matt Reid had left the band and that Steve Wilson, the former drummer of Japanese Voyeurs and Dinosaur Pile-Up, had joined the band. During 2012 Hawk Eyes toured extensively throughout the UK, Europe and Japan. Ideas received high praise from the rock press including 5Ks in Kerrang, being nominated for Best Newcomer at 2012's Kerrang awards.

Whilst still touring, Hawk Eyes released a new EP in 2013 titled That's What This Is via Pledgemusic. The band also commenced writing & recording a new album.

In 2014, the band continued to record their third album with producer Andy Hawkins. The new album 'Everything is Fine' will be released in February 2015, pre sale being announced in October 2014. They also announced a 9 date UK tour for February. Lead single 'Die Trying' is released in November, having been premiered on Dan Carter's Radio 1 rock show.

Discography

Studio albums
Modern Bodies (2010, CD digipak)
Ideas (2012)
Everything Is Fine (2015)
Advice (2019)

EPs
A or Not? (2009, enhanced CD digipak)
Mindhammers (2011, vinyl + download)
That's What This Is

Demos
2005 - CD

Split releases
"I Breathe Spears"/"With Scissors Split" (2006, CD)
"Hawk Eyes"/"Castrovalva"/"Dolphins"/"Blacklisters" (2011, 10" vinyl)

Compilation appearances
Salt the Wound Records - The Sky Is Bleeding (2007, CD)
Dance to the Radio - 4x12" Vol 3 (2009, 12" vinyl)
Exploding in Sound - Battery Acid Audio (2011, free download)

References

English metalcore musical groups
Hardcore punk groups from Leeds
Alternative rock groups from Leeds